Natani Nunatak is a nunatak 1.5 nautical miles (2.8 km) north-northeast of the extremity of Snake Ridge in the Patuxent Range, Pensacola Mountains. Mapped by United States Geological Survey (USGS) from surveys and U.S. Navy air photos, 1956–66. Named by Advisory Committee on Antarctic Names (US-ACAN) for Kirmach Natani, biologist at South Pole Station, winter 1967.

Nunataks of Queen Elizabeth Land